Alberto Sáenz (born 12 July 1934) is an Argentine boxer. He competed in the men's light middleweight event at the 1956 Summer Olympics.

References

External links
 

1934 births
Living people
Argentine male boxers
Olympic boxers of Argentina
Boxers at the 1956 Summer Olympics
Pan American Games bronze medalists for Argentina
Pan American Games medalists in boxing
Boxers at the 1955 Pan American Games
Place of birth missing (living people)
Light-middleweight boxers
Medalists at the 1955 Pan American Games